See If I Care may refer to:

Music

Albums
See If I Care (Gary Allan album) 2003

Songs
"See If I Care", single by Barbara McNair, Don Wolf, Ben Raleigh 1958
"See If I Care", single by Judy Lynn 1958
See If I Care (song), a song by American country music group Shenandoah written by Walt Aldridge and Robert Byrne 1990
"See If I Care", song by Gary Allan Jamie O'Hara on See If I Care (Gary Allan album)
"See If I Care", single by Ria Bartok F. Pourcel, R. Lefebvre, P. Delance, B. Barratt	1964
"See If I Care", single by Martika, on Martika (album) Greatest Hits compilation I Feel the Earth Move (album) 1998
"See If I Care", song by Fracus on Hardcore Nation: Next Generation
"See If I Care", song by Mother Goose on Stuffed (album) 1977
"See If I Care", song by Finnish band Disco Ensemble on First Aid Kit (album) 2005